In geometry, a Lambert quadrilateral (also known as Ibn al-Haytham–Lambert quadrilateral), is a quadrilateral in which three of its angles are right angles. Historically, the fourth angle of a Lambert quadrilateral was of considerable interest since if it could be shown to be a right angle, then the Euclidean parallel postulate could be proved as a theorem. It is now known that the type of the fourth angle depends upon the geometry in which the quadrilateral exists. In hyperbolic geometry the fourth angle is acute, in Euclidean geometry it is a right angle and in elliptic geometry it is an obtuse angle.

A Lambert quadrilateral can be constructed from a Saccheri quadrilateral by joining the midpoints of the base and summit of the Saccheri quadrilateral. This line segment is perpendicular to both the base and summit and so either half of the Saccheri quadrilateral is a Lambert quadrilateral.

Lambert quadrilateral in hyperbolic geometry

In hyperbolic geometry a Lambert quadrilateral AOBF where the angles  are right, and F is opposite O , is an acute angle , and the  curvature = -1 the following relations hold:

 

 

 
 

 
 

Where  are hyperbolic functions

Examples

See also 
 Non-Euclidean geometry

Notes

References
George E. Martin, The Foundations of Geometry and the Non-Euclidean Plane, Springer-Verlag, 1975
M. J. Greenberg, Euclidean and Non-Euclidean Geometries: Development and History, 4th edition, W. H. Freeman, 2008.

Hyperbolic geometry
Types of quadrilaterals